The broad-ringed white-eye (Zosterops eurycricotus) or Kilimanjaro white-eye is a bird species in the family Zosteropidae. It is found in northeast Tanzania.

The broad-ringed white-eye was formerly considered a subspecies of the montane white-eye, now Heuglin's white-eye (Zosterops poliogastrus).

References

broad-ringed white-eye
Endemic fauna of Tanzania
broad-ringed white-eye
Taxa named by Gustav Fischer